Within some criminal justice systems, a preliminary hearing, preliminary examination, preliminary inquiry, evidentiary hearing or probable cause hearing is a proceeding, after a criminal complaint has been filed by the prosecutor, to determine whether there is enough evidence to require a trial. At such a hearing, the defendant may be assisted by a lawyer.

Canada
In Canada, a preliminary hearing is sometimes referred to as a preliminary inquiry. During the preliminary inquiry, a hearing is held by the court to determine if there is enough evidence to justify a trial. Preliminary inquiries are only held when a person is charged with an indictable offence. The Crown Attorney may call witnesses. If there is not enough evidence, the court will dismiss the charge(s).

In the aftermath of the 2016 Jordan decision, in which the Supreme Court of Canada imposed time limits on the Crown to bring criminal cases to trial, the Crown has started to use the direct indictment procedure more frequently.

Scotland
In Scotland, a preliminary hearing is a non-evidential diet in cases to be tried before the High Court of Justiciary. It is a pre-trial diet to enable the court to be advised whether both parties, the prosecution and the defence, are ready to proceed to trial and may also deal with ancillary procedural matters.

United States
In the United States, at a preliminary hearing the judge must find that such evidence provides probable cause to believe that the crime was committed, and that the crime was committed by the defendant. There is a right to counsel at the preliminary hearing.

The conduct of the preliminary hearing as well as the specific rules regarding the admissibility of evidence vary from jurisdiction to jurisdiction. Hearsay is typically allowed. If the court decide that there is probable cause, a formal charging instrument (called the information in some jurisdictions) will be issued; and the prosecution will continue.  If the court should find there is no probable cause, then typically the prosecution will cease.  Many jurisdictions, however, allow the prosecution to seek a new preliminary hearing, or even seek a bill of indictment from a grand jury.

The key questions that a preliminary hearing normally addresses are:

Is there probable cause to believe the alleged crime occurred and did it occur within the court's jurisdiction?
Is there probable cause to believe that the defendant committed the crime?

If a judge determines that there is sufficient evidence to believe that the defendant committed the crime, it is said that the defendant is "bound over".

Terminology
Legal terminology varies between U.S. jurisdictions; in some jurisdictions a reference to a "preliminary hearing" may refer to a different type of hearing than is described in this article.

In criminal prosecutions the court schedules an arraignment at which the charges are formally presented to the defendant. In many states criminal charges may be commenced with the prosecutor's filing an "information" with the court, a document that describes basic facts alleged to constitute a criminal offense by the defendant and the criminal laws that the defendant is alleged to have violated. The defendant is then scheduled for an arraignment at which the charge is formally presented. If the defendant does not plead guilty at the arraignment, the court schedules a preliminary hearing.

Where an indictment is obtained through means other than an information, such as through grand jury proceedings or after an arrest when the defendant is first brought to court, the arraignment may be described using terms such as "initial hearing", or "preliminary arraignment", creating the possibility of confusing with a preliminary hearing. Those other hearings are not probable cause hearings.

State law
A preliminary hearing is not always required and its requirement varies by jurisdiction. Some states hold preliminary hearings in every serious criminal case; in others, they are held upon request by the defense; and in still others, they are only held in felony cases.

Federal law
If the defendant is charged with a felony under federal law, the defendant has the right to an indictment by a grand jury, pursuant to the Fifth Amendment to the Constitution and Title 18 of the United States Code. At grand jury proceedings, the defendant is not entitled to have counsel present in the grand jury room (although witnesses may consult with counsel outside of the presence of the grand jury) and indeed may not even know that a grand jury is considering the case.

See also
Article 32 hearing
Committal procedure
Grand jury

Notes

Scottish criminal law
United States criminal procedure